The Curious House Guest is a British television documentary series first broadcast on BBC Two in 2005. It is written and presented by Jeremy Musson, an architectural historian and journalist with Country Life. In each episode he visits a historic private house and combines observations on architecture with insights into the lives of the owners.

Episode list

Series one, 2005
 Chillingham Castle, Northumberland
 Chavenage House, Tetbury, Gloucester
 Burghley House, Stamford, Lincolnshire
 Castle Leslie, Monaghan
 Bellamont House, Dorset
 Bryngwyn Hall, Bwlch-y-Cibau, Llanfyllin, Powys

Series two, 2006
 Holkham Hall, Norfolk
 Ninfa, Lazio, Italy
 Vann, Surrey (architect: W.D. Caroe)
 Hampden Great House, Jamaica
 Renishaw Hall, Derbyshire (owner: Sir Reresby Sitwell)
 Hippo Point, Kenya
 Stradey Castle, Llanelli, Carmarthenshire
 Provender House, Kent (owner: Princess Olga Andreevna Romanoff)

See also
Living with Modernism

External links
 
 
 Podcast of Holkham Hall episode
 Diary of a Curious House Guest

BBC television documentaries
2000s British documentary television series
2005 British television series debuts
2006 British television series endings
Television shows about British architecture